River Ridge is an unincorporated community in Monroe County, Alabama, United States.

Notable person
John McDuffie, jurist and legislator, was born in River Ridge.

Notes

Unincorporated communities in Monroe County, Alabama
Unincorporated communities in Alabama